"Highway Don't Care" is a song recorded by American country music singer Tim McGraw and singer-songwriter Taylor Swift on vocals, featuring Keith Urban on guitar. It was released to US country radio on March 25, 2013, as the third single from McGraw's first album for Big Machine Records, Two Lanes of Freedom (2013). The song was written by Mark Irwin, Josh Kear and Brad and Brett Warren. To date, this is Swift’s seventh number one hit.  McGraw and Swift recorded their parts separately.

Composition
The song is a mid-tempo ballad where the male narrator is separated from his lover who is driving. Throughout the verses, he tells her what he "bets" she is feeling, when a song comes on her radio (its part sung by Swift) containing the lines "I can't live without you, baby." He also says that the highway she's driving on doesn't care if she's alone or if she's going home, but he does. The song is in D major with a main chord pattern of D-B7-G-A. Keith Urban plays lead guitar on it.

Critical reception
In his review of the album, Thom Jurek of AllMusic wrote that "the hook is irresistible and McGraw's vocal, paired with the young singer's, is a perfect match." Chuck Dauphin of Roughstock also reviewed the song favorably, saying that "this song flows well, with winning performances from two of the format's top vocalists." Billy Dukes of Taste of Country gave the song five stars saying that the track is arguably "one of the best collaborations of the decade – maybe even ever. Each artist brings his or her best effort to the song from McGraw's Two Lanes of Freedom album. 'Highway Don't Care' feels like a special moment from the very first listen, and only becomes more cathartic with time." Jeff Benjamin of Fuse said the track has "major crossover potential". The song was ranked 30th best country song of the 2010s by Taste Of Country.

Accolades

Chart performance
The single has also been a commercial success. "Highway Don't Care" debuted at number 13 on the US Billboard Hot Country Songs chart and number 43 on the US Billboard Country Airplay chart for the week of February 23, 2013, due to unsolicited airplay seven weeks before being released to radio. It also debuted at number 59 on the US Billboard Hot 100 and number 23 on the Canadian Hot 100 for the week of February 23, 2013. The single also debuted at number one on the US Billboard Country Digital Songs chart with 86,000 downloads for the week of February 13, 2013. On October 17, 2017, the single was certified triple platinum by the Recording Industry Association of America (RIAA) for combined sales and streaming data of over three million units. As of November 2017, the song has sold 2.3 million copies in the United States.

Music video
The music video was directed by Shane Drake and premiered on May 6, 2013. The music video for the song features Tim McGraw, Taylor Swift, and Keith Urban, as well as actors portraying the song's narrator and his lover. It was made in partnership with Vanderbilt University Medical Center in Nashville, Tennessee and highlights the dangers of driving while distracted, particularly texting and driving. In the video, the narrator's lover mentioned in the song is driving, crying, and texting the narrator. After dropping her phone and trying to retrieve it, she drifts into the wrong lane while reaching across her car and collides with oncoming traffic. She is then airlifted by a Vanderbilt LifeFlight helicopter to Vanderbilt University Medical Center, where she is treated in the Adult Emergency Department. The video implies that she survives as the doctor comes out to see the girl's parents and the narrator, after which they are seen smiling happily and embracing that their daughter's going to be okay.

The structure of the video at first seems to imply that Tim McGraw (as the singer/narrator and a character in the video) is the boyfriend who keeps being texted by the female driver. Upon the LifeFlight helicopter arriving at the hospital, the viewer realizes that Tim McGraw's character is actually the physician who saves the driver's life, and the texts he had been receiving earlier in the video were from the hospital paging/notifying him about this emergency. Taylor Swift was standing in the bedroom-curtain. Keith Urban was standing on the beach.

Official versions
Album version (4:36)
Duet with Brazilian singer Paula Fernandes, a Porglish version (4:38)

Charts

Weekly charts

Year-end charts

Certifications

References

2013 singles
Tim McGraw songs
Taylor Swift songs
Male–female vocal duets
Songs written by Josh Kear
Songs written by the Warren Brothers
Songs written by Mark Irwin (songwriter)
Song recordings produced by Byron Gallimore
Song recordings produced by Tim McGraw
Music videos directed by Shane Drake
Country ballads
Big Machine Records singles
2013 songs
2010s ballads
Vehicle wreck ballads